Old Eidgah, Madannapet is a two minaret Eidgah (open air mosque) located at Madannapet in Hyderabad, Telangana, India. It was built during qutub shahi rule in 16th century. 
this mosque contain two huge minarat which looks highly magnificent. Only eid namaz is offered here.  Old Eidgah Madannapet is an archeologically protected monument.

References

External Links
https://www.thehindu.com/news/cities/Hyderabad/heritage-award-for-longforgotten-idgah/article2426092.ece

Heritage structures in Hyderabad, India
Hyderabad State